The Holy Spirit Cathedral, located in Accra, is the main church of the Roman Catholic Archdiocese of Accra.

The first proposal to build a Catholic cathedral in Accra came from Apostolic Delegate David Matthews in 1947.  This was enthusiastically taken up by Adolph Noser, who in 1950 became the first Bishop of Accra.  Following a lengthy search for a suitable site, land in the West Ridge area of Adabraka was purchased from the British crown and the Methodist Church.

The cathedral was designed by Joseph Jud, and groundbreaking took place in 1952.  The first services took place the following year, although the building did not yet have a roof, and it was completed and consecrated in 1957.  In 1958, the cathedral was given its own parish.

References

Churches in Accra
Roman Catholic cathedrals in Ghana
Roman Catholic churches completed in 1957
20th-century Roman Catholic church buildings